Priest Point is a former census-designated place (CDP) in Snohomish County, Washington, United States. The population was 779 at the 2000 census. The CDP was discontinued at the 2010 census.

Based on per capita income, one of the more reliable measures of affluence, Priest Point ranks 74th of 522 areas in the state of Washington to be ranked.

Geography
Priest Point is located at  (48.037127, -122.231268).

According to the United States Census Bureau, the CDP has a total area of 3.0 square miles (7.7 km2), of which, 0.6 square miles (1.7 km2) of it is land and 2.3 square miles (6.0 km2) of it (78.38%) is water.

Demographics
As of the census of 2000, there were 779 people, 318 households, and 235 families residing in the CDP. The population density was 1,209.1 people per square mile (470.0/km2). There were 344 housing units at an average density of 533.9/sq mi (207.5/km2). The racial makeup of the CDP was 82.16% White, 0.64% African American, 12.58% Native American, 0.77% Asian, 0.13% Pacific Islander, 0.26% from other races, and 3.47% from two or more races. Hispanic or Latino of any race were 1.67% of the population.

There were 318 households, out of which 28.3% had children under the age of 18 living with them, 59.7% were married couples living together, 8.8% had a female householder with no husband present, and 26.1% were non-families. 20.4% of all households were made up of individuals, and 8.2% had someone living alone who was 65 years of age or older. The average household size was 2.45 and the average family size was 2.80.

In the CDP, the age distribution of the population shows 20.4% under the age of 18, 6.0% from 18 to 24, 25.2% from 25 to 44, 32.9% from 45 to 64, and 15.5% who were 65 years of age or older. The median age was 44 years. For every 100 females, there were 102.3 males. For every 100 females age 18 and over, there were 94.4 males.

The median income for a household in the CDP was $52,344, and the median income for a family was $59,327. Males had a median income of $51,184 versus $28,333 for females. The per capita income for the CDP was $26,322. About 5.7% of families and 6.9% of the population were below the poverty line, including 15.3% of those under age 18 and 3.1% of those age 65 or over.

References

Populated places in Snohomish County, Washington
Former census-designated places in Washington (state)